HauteLook is a member-only shopping website offering flash-sales and limited-time sale events featuring women's and men's fashion, jewelry and accessories, beauty products, kid's clothing and toys, and home décor. HauteLook offers discounts of 50 to 75 percent off retail prices with new sale events every morning. Launched in 2007, HauteLook is owned and operated by Nordstrom.

History
HauteLook was launched in December 2007 in Los Angeles, California by Adam Bernhard, a serial entrepreneur and former senior vice president at Joie clothing. Bernhard initially started the site as liquid8usa.com while he was working at Joie and noticed a market for off-price goods that were either in excess or leftover merchandise. In 2007, he renamed the website and launched HauteLook in Los Angeles with four employees.

HauteLook was purchased by Nordstrom in March 2011 for $180 million in stock. This marks the first time that a traditional retailer has acquired a company specializing in online private sales.

In October 2013, Bernhard stepped down as chief executive officer of the company. He remains as an advisor to HauteLook and President Terry Boyle continues to lead the business, though no other CEO will be chosen.

In May 2014, HauteLook launched nordstromrack.com, an e-commerce site and mobile app, built on a shared platform that gives customers access to shop Nordstrom Rack merchandise alongside HauteLook flash sale events with Hautelook having more luxury retail items than Nordstrom Rack.

In August of 2018, hackers stole data relating to over 28.5 million accounts and placed it for sale on the dark web. This security breach included email addresses, bcrypt hashed passwords, and names. The security breach was uncovered in February of 2019.

See also
Nordstrom
flash-sales
List of data breaches

References

External links
 

Online retailers of the United States
American companies established in 2007
Retail companies established in 2007
Internet properties established in 2007
2011 mergers and acquisitions